Kasipalayam (G) is a panchayat town in Erode district in the Indian state of Tamil Nadu.

It is located near Gobichettipalayam, Erode.

Demographics
 India census, Kasipalayam (G) had a population of 8483. Males constitute 51% of the population and females 49%. Kasipalayam (G) has an average literacy rate of 56%, lower than the national average of 59.5%: male literacy is 65%, and female literacy is 47%. In Kasipalayam (G), 8% of the population is under 6 years of age. it consists of beautiful natural resources and there are many tourist places around the town

References

Cities and towns in Erode district